Chilpancingo de los Bravo (commonly shortened to Chilpancingo; ; Nahuatl:  Chilpantsinko) is the capital and second-largest city of the state of Guerrero, Mexico. In 2010 it had a population of 187,251 people. The city is on Mexican Federal Highway 95 which connects Acapulco to Mexico City. It is served by Chilpancingo National Airport, which is one of the five airports in the state.

History
In pre-Columbian times, the area was occupied by the Olmecs, who built an extensive tunnel network through the mountains, and left the cave paintings in the caverns of Juxtlahuaca. The city of Chilpancingo was founded on November 1, 1591, by the Spanish conquistadores, its name meaning “Place of Wasps” in Nahuatl. During the War of Independence, Chilpancingo was crucial to the insurgent cause as its population participated actively and decisively in their favor, and became a strategic point for military action in the south. Chilpancingo was very important to Mexican history because it was here where the National Congress met under José María Morelos y Pavón in 1813 during the Mexican War of Independence.
 
General Nicolás Catalán, husband of the independence war heroine Antonia Nava de Catalán, was made commander of the state of Guerrero on 24 January 1828. The family settled in Chilpancingo, where both Nicolás and Antonia later died.
In 1853, Chilpancingo was declared the provisional capital of the state, due to an epidemic that struck the then capital of Tixtla, and regional ecclesiastical organizational changes were made at the same time. In 1870 it was again declared capital by Governor Francisco O. Arce, due to the opposition led by General Jimenez, who was in possession of the official seat of government at Tixtla. It was not until 1871, when the state legislature agreed to a change of venue, that the capital was moved again from Chilpancingo.
 
During the Mexican Revolution, Chilpancingo was deeply troubled and had political and administrative importance as a strategic place for the sides in the debate. Battles took place in the vicinity in the 1910s, in which Emiliano Zapata defeated federal forces of Porfirio Diaz, Francisco I. Madero, Victoriano Huerta and Venustiano Carranza. A major defeat of Huerta's southern forces took place here in March April 1914; the Zapatistas took the town until after the Constitutional Convention.

In 1960, the city entered a severe social crisis with the start of a student popular movement at the Autonomous University of Guerrero, protests which led to a general strike at the institution and later swarmed to various forces and social sectors of the city and the state. The main objective was to diminish the power of the state government and seek autonomy for the college. On April 27, 2009 an earthquake with a magnitude of 5.6 was centered near Chilpancingo.

Geography

Climate 
The climate of Chilpacingo is classified as a tropical savanna climate ("Aw"). There is some moderation due to high elevation, but high temperatures are still in the upper 20s °C (80s °F) for most of the year.

Economy
In 1869, the Autonomous University of Guerrero was established in Chilpancingo; it still plays a considerable role in the local economy.
The city is a producer of processed foods and alcoholic beverages, and is a market for maize, sugarcane, bananas, livestock, and lumber produced in the region.

Archaeology
"Pezuapan" is an archaeological site located in Chilpancingo city. It sits on the eastern slope of the Chilpancingo valley. The archaeological vestiges found at the site cover the total area of 4000 m2. The dates are from 650 AD to 1150 AD.

Other archaeological sites found in this area of Guerrero are:

Teopantecuanitlan
Oxtotitlán
Tehuacalco
Organera-Xochipala
Cuetlajuchitlán

Twin towns – sister cities
 McAllen, United States
 Cavite City, Philippines

See also 

 Congress of Chilpancingo

References

External links

Ayuntamiento de Chilpancingo de los Bravo  Official website

 
Populated places in Guerrero
Capitals of states of Mexico
Cities in Mexico
Sierra Madre del Sur